Peridot ( PERR-ih-dot, -⁠doh), sometimes called chrysolite, is a deep yellowish-green transparent variety of olivine. Peridot is one of the few gemstones that occurs in only one color. 

Peridot can be found in mafic and ultramafic rocks occurring in lava and peridotite xenoliths of the mantle. The gem occurs in silica-deficient rocks such as volcanic basalt and pallasitic meteorites. Peridot is one of only two gems observed to be formed not in the Earth’s crust, but in the molten rock of the upper mantle. Gem-quality peridot is rare on Earth's surface due to its susceptibility to weathering during its movement from deep within the mantle to the surface. Peridot has the formula of (Mg, Fe)2SiO4. Peridot is one of the birthstones for the month of August.

Etymology
The origin of the name peridot is uncertain. The Oxford English Dictionary suggests an alteration of Anglo–Norman  (classical Latin -), a kind of opal, rather than the Arabic word , meaning "gem".

The earliest use in England is in the register of the St Albans Abbey, in Latin, and its translation in 1705 is possibly the first use of peridot in English. It records that on his death in 1245, Bishop John bequeathed various items, including peridot, to the Abbey.

Appearance
Peridot is one of the few gemstones that occur in only one color: an olive-green. The intensity and tint of the green, however, depends on the percentage of iron in the crystal structure, so the color of individual peridot gems can vary from yellow, to olive, to brownish-green.  In rare cases, peridot may have a medium-dark toned, pure green with no secondary yellow hue or brown mask. Lighter colored gems are due to lower iron concentrations.

Mineral properties

Crystal structure 

The molecular structure of peridot consist of isomorphic olivine, silicate, magnesium and iron in an orthorhombic crystal system. In an alternative view, the atomic structure can be described as a hexagonal, close-packed array of oxygen ions with half of the octahedral sites occupied with magnesium or iron ions and one-eighth of the tetrahedral sites occupied by silicon ions.

Surface property 
The oxidation of the olivine occurs by initial breakdown of the fayalite component, and subsequent reaction with the forsterite component, to give magnetite and orthopyroxene.

Occurrence

Geologically
Olivine, of which peridot is a type, is a common mineral in mafic and ultramafic rocks, often found in lava and in peridotite xenoliths of the mantle, which lava carries to the surface; however, gem-quality peridot occurs in only a fraction of these settings. Peridots can also be found in meteorites.

Peridots can be differentiated by size and composition. A peridot formed as a result of volcanic activity tends to contain higher concentrations of lithium, nickel and zinc than those found in meteorites.

Olivine is an abundant mineral, but gem-quality peridot is rather rare due to its chemical instability on Earth's surface. Olivine is usually found as small grains and tends to exist in a heavily weathered state, unsuitable for decorative use. Large crystals of forsterite, the variety most often used to cut peridot gems, are rare; as a result peridot is considered to be precious.

In the ancient world, mining of peridot, called topazios then, on St. John's Island in the Red Sea began about 300 B.C.

The principal source of peridot olivine today is the San Carlos Apache Indian Reservation in Arizona. It is also mined at another location in Arizona, and in Arkansas, Hawaii, Nevada, and New Mexico at Kilbourne Hole, in the US; and in Australia, Brazil, China, Egypt, Kenya, Mexico, Myanmar (Burma), Norway, Pakistan, Saudi Arabia, South Africa, Sri Lanka, and Tanzania.

In meteorites

Peridot crystals have been collected from some pallasite meteorites. The most commonly studied pallasitic peridot belongs to the Indonesian Jeppara meteorite, but others exist such as the Brenham, Esquel, Fukang, and Imilac meteorites.
Pallasitic (extraterrestrial) peridot differs chemically from its earthbound counterpart, in that pallasitic peridot lacks nickel.

Gemology
All minerals that are orthorhombic, like peridot, are biaxial and are defined by three principal axes: α, β, γ. Refractive index readings of faceted gems contain indices α = 1.653, β = 1.670, and γ = 1.689 with a corresponding biaxial birefringence of 0.036.  The refractive index, as well as the specific gravity, slightly vary depending on the iron concentration; a dominant cause of peridot color variation. The numerical β index tends to shift towards the α and γ index with a corresponding increase in the iron concentration — forming the iron-rich end member fayalite.
 
Study of Chinese peridot gem samples determined the specific gravity hydro-statically to be 3.36. The visible-light spectroscopy of the same Chinese peridot samples showed light bands between 493.0 and 481.0 nm, the strongest absorption at 492.0 nm.

Inclusions are common in peridot crystals but their presence depend on the location it is found at and the geological conditions that led to the crystallization of the peridot. Primary negative crystals — rounded gas bubbles — form in-situ with peridot and are common in Hawaiian peridots. Secondary negative crystals form in peridot fractures. Lily pad cleavages, seen often in San Carlos peridots, are a type of secondary negative crystal and are viewed easily under reflected light as circular discs surrounding a negative crystal. Silky and rod-like inclusions are common in Pakistani peridots. The most common mineral inclusion in peridot is the chromium-rich mineral chromite. Magnesium-rich minerals also can exist in the form of pyrope and magnesiochromite. These two types of mineral inclusions typically surrounded lily-pad cleavages. Biotite flakes appear flat, brown, translucent, and tabular.

The largest cut peridot olivine is a  specimen in the Smithsonian Museum in Washington, D.C.

Cultural history 
Peridot has been prized since the earliest civilizations for its claimed protective powers to drive away fears and nightmares, according to superstitions. It is believed by some superstitious people to carry the gift of "inner radiance", sharpening the mind and opening it to new levels of awareness and growth, helping one to recognize and realize one’s destiny and spiritual purpose. There is no scientific evidence for such claims.

Peridot is sometimes mistaken for emeralds and other green gems. Notable gemologist George Frederick Kunz discussed the confusion between emeralds and peridot in many church treasures, notably the "Three Magi" treasure in the Dom of Cologne, Germany.

Peridot olivine is the birthstone for the month of August.

Gallery

References

External links

 Ganoksin
 Mineralminers
USGS peridot data
Emporia Edu
Florida State University – Peridot

Gemstones
Silicate minerals